Charles Marie Raymond d'Arenberg (Enghien, 1 April 1721 – Enghien, 17 August 1778) was the fifth Duke of Arenberg, 11th Duke of Aarschot and an Austrian field marshal.

Biography

Charles Marie was the eldest son of Duke Leopold Philippe d'Arenberg and Donna Maria Francesca Pignatelli. His sister was Marie Victoire d'Arenberg, wife of Augustus George, Margrave of Baden-Baden.

Charles Marie joined his father's 1743 campaign in the War of Austrian Succession, first as lieutenant-colonel and later as colonel of the second Walloon Infantry Regiment, which he had raised personally. He commanded this regiment in the 1744 and 1745 campaigns, until he became colonel of the Baden-Baden Regiment. One year later he became major general. In 1748, he played an important role in the defence of Maastricht against the French.

Charles Marie also became Grand-Bailli of Hainaut and Mons in 1740.

In the first years of the Seven Years' War, he was active in the Bohemian theater of war. He participated in the Battle of Prague (1757) and the many battles that followed.

In 1758, he was promoted to Feldzeugmeister. On 14 October of that year, he played a crucial role in the victorious Battle of Hochkirch as commander of the right wing of the Austrian Army. For this, he was awarded the Grand Cross of the Military Order of Maria Theresa. In the 1759 campaign, he commanded several Army Corps and was defeated near Dresden on 29 October by Prussian troops under General Wunsch. He was praised for his actions in the lost Battle of Torgau on 3 November 1760, in which he was severely wounded.

These wounds meant the end of his active career, and he retired. In 1776, he was admitted to the Geheimrat, and he was made Field Marshal in 1777.

Family 

He married Countess Louise Margarethe von der Marck-Schleiden (1730-1820), daughter of Count Louis Engelbert von der Marck-Schleiden in 1748.

They had eight children, amongst whom 
 Louis Engelbert, 6th Duke of Arenberg (1750–1820),
 Auguste Marie Raymond (1753-1833),
 Marie Louise Françoise (1754-1838), married Ludwig, Prince of Starhemberg.

His sister, Princess Marie-Flore d'Arenberg, was the wife of Count Jean Charles de Merode-Deynze.

{| class="toccolours collapsible collapsed" style="width:100%; background:inherit"
|-
!Charles Marie, ancestor of Guillaume & Stéphanie of Luxembourg
|-
|
 

 
 
 
 
 
 
 
 
 
 
 
 
 
 
 
 {{Tree chart | S1 |~|~|y|~| Gui | S1=Countess Stéphanie de Lannoy (18 February 1984 - )| Gui= Guillaume, Hereditary Grand Duke of Luxembourg (11 November 1981 - )'}}

|}

Notes

References
 Encyclopædia Britannica, 1911.
 Millar, Simon and Adam Hook, Kolin 1757: Frederick the Great's first defeat'', Osprey Publishing Ltd., 2001.

Further reading
Arenberg Foundation

1721 births
1778 deaths
People from Enghien
Field marshals of Austria
Charles Marie Raymond
Charles Marie Raymond
Charles Marie Raymond
Knights of the Golden Fleece of Austria
Grand Crosses of the Military Order of Maria Theresa
Nobility of the Austrian Netherlands
Generals of the Holy Roman Empire